Melhem Barakat (‎; 15 August 1945 – 28 October 2016), also known as Melhim Barakat, or Abou Majd was a Lebanese singer, songwriter, and melodist. Barakat was a well-renowned singer in Lebanon and the wider Arab world. He toured Australia, South America, Canada, and the United States.

Early life
Barakat was born on 15 August 1945, in Kfarshima, Lebanon. He inherited his affinity for music from his father, who was a carpenter and taught Melhem how to play the oud. In 1960, Barakat dropped out of school at the age of 18 and enrolled into the National Institute of Music without his father's knowledge. He studied music theory, Solfège and Eastern singing. He would drop out of the institute four years later at the advice of Philemon Wehbe, beginning his professional career.

Career
Barakat started his career in the 1960s. He participated as an actor and singer in many of the Rahbani brothers' musicals and operettas. In 1968, he left the brothers to pursue a solo career.

Since the 1990s, Melhem Barakat had several popular songs, such as "Habibi Enta," which was later sung by his ex-wife May Hariri. He also collaborated with Najwa Karam, Karol Sakr, Shatha Hassoun, and Majida El Roumi.

Musical style
Barakat composed music for some of the best Arab singers of the past century, including Sabah, Samira Tewfik, Wadih El Safi and Majida El Roumi ("I'tazalt al-Gharam"). Barakat was known for his energetic songs that mixed classical music with his personal improvisations.

Notable songs

Personal life
Barakat was first married to  Souad Feghali, the sister of Lebanese singer Sabah. Then he later married Randa Azar with whom he had three children: Majd (Hence Melhem's alias Abou Majd), Waad and Ghinwa. His third and final marriage was to Lebanese singer and actress May Hariri, with whom he had a child, Melhem Junior, before the couple divorced. He was Antiochian Orthodox Christian.

Death
He died from cancer on 28 October 2016 at Hôtel-Dieu de France hospital in Achrafieh, Lebanon. He was 71. His funeral took place at Saint Nicolas Church in Achrafieh, Beirut.
Many Lebanese singers and politicians were present at the funeral mass, including Ragheb Alama, Fares Karam, Majida El Roumi, Rola Saad and Barakat's ex-wife May Hariri.

Tribute
On August 15, 2021, Google celebrated his 76th birthday with a Google Doodle.

References

External links

 

1945 births
2016 deaths
People from Kfarshima
Lebanese composers
Lebanese songwriters
Lebanese pop singers
EMI Records artists
Greek Orthodox Christians from Lebanon
20th-century Lebanese male singers
21st-century Lebanese male singers